Peringuey's leaf-toed gecko (Cryptactites peringueyi), also known commonly as the salt marsh gecko, is a species of lizard in the family Gekkonidae. The species is endemic to South Africa.

Etymology
The specific name, peringueyi, is in honor of French entomologist Louis Péringuey.

Description
It has a red-brown body sometimes with thin, pale dark stripes.

Behavior and reproduction
Peringuey's leaf-toed gecko is nocturnal and lives in matted marsh vegetation where it lays two minute eggs in summer.

Geographic range and habitat
C. peringueyi is endemic to South Africa, being restricted to a few salt marshes in the Eastern Cape.

Conservation status
C. peringueyi was believed to be extinct for a long time, but a tiny population was rediscovered in 1992 by the estuary of the Kromme river.

References

Further reading
Boulenger GA (1910). "A Revised List of the South African Reptiles and Batrachians, with Synoptic Tables, special reference to the specimens in the South African Museum, and Descriptions of New Species". Ann. South African Mus. 5: 455–538. (Phyllodactylus peringueyi, new species, pp. 493–494).
Branch, Bill (2004). Field Guide to Snakes and other Reptiles of Southern Africa. Third Revised edition, Second impression. Sanibel Island, Florida: Ralph Curtis Books. 399 pp. . (Cryptactites peringueyi, p. 239 + Plate 108).

Geckos of Africa
Endemic reptiles of South Africa
Reptiles described in 1910
Gekkonidae
Taxonomy articles created by Polbot